Evans Névé is a large névé which nourishes Tucker Glacier, Mariner Glacier, Aviator Glacier, Rennick Glacier and Lillie Glacier in Victoria Land, Antarctica. The névé was named in honor for Edgar Evans of the ill-fated British Antarctic Expedition, 1910–13, by the Northern Party of the New Zealand Geological Survey Antarctic Expedition, 1963–64. Evans, along with Edward Adrian Wilson, Lawrence Oates and Henry Robertson Bowers, accompanied Captain Robert F. Scott to the Geographic South Pole, January 17, 1912. All five perished on the return journey after failing to beat Norwegian explorer Roald Amundsen to the 90th parallel. This glaciological feature lies situated on the Pennell Coast, a portion of Antarctica lying between Cape Williams and Cape Adare.

References 

Snow fields of the Ross Dependency
Landforms of Victoria Land
Pennell Coast
Névés of Antarctica